The Flying Saucer Mystery is the 58th volume in the Nancy Drew Mystery Stories series. It was written in 1980 under the pseudonym Carolyn Keene and published by Simon & Schuster under the Wanderer imprint. It was later republished in both Wanderer and Minstrel imprints, each time with a new cover. In 2005, Grosset & Dunlap reprinted it in the yellow hardback "glossy flashlight" format. The original edition cover and six internal illustrations were by Ruth Sanderson. These illustrations were removed in the two subsequent printings.

Plot summary
Nancy Drew and her friends visit the Shawniegunk Forest in search of a mysterious flying saucer that is disturbing the locals. While they are working on this mystery, a naturalist who lives in the area asks them to help him search for a treasure left to him by his late father. They also must solve the mystery of a Native American man who mysteriously appears and disappears.

Characters

INA version
 Nancy Drew
 Carson Drew: Nancy's father
 Hannah Gruen: Nancy's family housekeeper
 Bess Marvin: Nancy's best friend
 George Fayne: Nancy's best friend, and Bess's first cousin
 Ned Nickerson: Nancy's boyfriend
 Burt Eddleton: George's boyfriend
 Dave Evans: Bess's boyfriend
 Mr Hal Drake:  Guide
 Mrs. Jan Drake: Guide and Hal Drake's wife
 Joseph Austin (Old Joe): Nturalist who lives in the forest
 Shoso:  Native American who mysteriously appears and disappears
 Dr. Doyle: Veterinarian
 Dr. Caffrey: Carson Drew's friend
 Dr. Halpern: Chemical expert
 Dr. York: Scientist
 Prof. Hendriks: Botany expert
 Colonel Akon
 Major Tanner

Animals
 Susan B: Nancy's horse
 Goalpost: Ned's horse
 Trixie: Old Joe's dog
 Kitty: Old Joe's wildcat

References

Nancy Drew books
1980 American novels
1980 children's books
Simon & Schuster books
Children's mystery novels